This is a list of bridges and other crossings of the Hudson River, from its mouth at the Upper New York Bay upstream to its cartographic beginning at Henderson Lake in Newcomb, New York.

Crossings
The crossings are listed from south to north.

See also

List of ferries across the Hudson River to New York City
List of fixed crossings of the East River
List of ferries across the East River

References

External links

 Hudson River Crossings (Roads of Metro New York)

Bridges in New York (state)

Hudson River
Hudson River